The 1992–93 NBA season was the Kings' 44th season in the National Basketball Association, and eighth season in Sacramento. The Kings had the seventh pick in the 1992 NBA draft, and selected Walt Williams from the University of Maryland, and signed free agents Rod Higgins and Kurt Rambis during the first month of the regular season. Under new head coach Garry St. Jean, the Kings got off to a fast start winning their first three games, but later posted a 7-game losing streak in December leading to a 6–16 start. The Kings would then post a 6-game winning streak between December and January, but continued to struggle losing 21 of their next 26 games, holding a 17–34 record at the All-Star break, as they were plagued with injuries. Mitch Richmond only played just 45 games due to a broken right thumb, and was out for the remainder of the season, and Williams only played 59 games due to a hand injury. The Kings lost 16 of their final 21 games, and finished last place in the Pacific Division with a 25–57 record.

Richmond led the team in scoring averaging 21.9 points per game, and was selected for the 1993 NBA All-Star Game, but did not play due to injury, while Lionel Simmons averaged 17.9 points, 7.2 rebounds, 4.5 assists and 1.4 steals per game, and Williams provided the team with 17.0 points per game, and was selected to the NBA All-Rookie Second Team. In addition, Wayman Tisdale averaged 16.6 points and 6.6 rebounds per game, while Spud Webb contributed 14.5 points, 7.0 assists and 1.5 steals per game, Anthony Bonner provided with 8.6 points and 6.5 rebounds per game, Higgins contributed 8.3 points per game off the bench, and Duane Causwell averaged 8.2 points, 5.5 rebounds and 1.6 blocks per game.

Following the season, Bonner signed as a free agent with the New York Knicks, while Higgins signed with the Cleveland Cavaliers during the next season, and Rambis re-signed with his former team, the Los Angeles Lakers.

Draft picks

Roster

Regular season

Season standings

z - clinched division title
y - clinched division title
x - clinched playoff spot

Record vs. opponents

Game log

Player statistics

Awards and records
 Walt Williams, NBA All-Rookie Team 2nd Team

Transactions

References

See also
 1992-93 NBA season

Sacramento Kings seasons
Sacramento
Sacramento
Sacramento